La Compagnie Marocaine (the Moroccan Company) was a French colonial holding company founded in 1902 for the purpose of exploiting Morocco.

History 
In 1902, a group of industrialists led by Eugène Schneider II founded the company with the purpose of organizing commercial, industrial, and agricultural activities in Morocco.

Eugène Schneider II was its first president. 

The Treaty of Algeciras of 1906, which formalized French preeminence in Morocco and precipitated the establishment of a French protectorate in Morocco, accorded a contract to construct modern ports in Casablanca and Asfi to Compagnie Marocaine. In fact, it was an attack on the company's Decauville train that incited the Bombardment of Casablanca in August 1907, marking the beginning of the French conquest of Morocco.

Starting in 1911, in order to secure an increase in capital, the presidency went to a representative of the Banque de l'Union Parisienne.

It participated in the creation of the Compagnie des Chemins de Fer du Maroc (Railroad Company of Morocco) and become a main shareholder.

La Compagnie Marocaine was listed in the Paris Bourse in 1920.

Administration

List of presidents 

 1903-1911: Eugène Schneider II
 1911-1914: Jules-Frédéric Lambert, marquis de Frondeville
 1914?-1922: Max Boucard
 1922-1923: Cornelis de Witt
 1923-1958: Jacques Feray

See also
 Compagnie Algérienne

References

Bibliography 

 Pierre Guillen, L'implatation de Schneider au Maroc, les débuts de la Compagnie marocaine (1902-1906), 1965
 André Adam, Histoire de Casablanca: des origines à 1914, 1968
 Mohamed Bouzidi, Histoire économique, le Maroc précolonial, 1981

French companies established in 1902
Holding companies of France
Holding companies established in 1902